Mivinjeni is an administrative ward in the Iringa Urban district of the Iringa Region of Tanzania. In 2016 the Tanzania National Bureau of Statistics report there were 5,002 people in the ward, from 4,780 in 2012.

Neighborhoods 
The ward has 7 neighborhoods.

 Darajani
 Frelimo 'A'
 Idunda
 Kanisani
 Kondoa
 Migombani
 Mjimwema

References 

Wards of Iringa Region